Kada or KADA may refer to:

Places
 Kada, Tibet, a village
 Kada Glacier, Tibet - see Lhagba La
 Kada, Togo, a village
 Kada, Maharashtra, a village in India

People
 Kada (surname)
 Kada Kechamli (born 1978), Algerian footballer
 Kada Delić (born 1965), race walker
 Kada Siddha

KADA
 KADA (AM), a radio station (1230 AM) licensed to Ada, Oklahoma, United States
 KADA-FM, a radio station (99.3 FM) licensed to Ada, Oklahoma, United States
 Kwajalein Atoll Development Authority- see Kwajalein Atoll

Other uses
 Kada (jewellery), a type of bracelet popular in India
 Kada Line, a railway line in Wakayama Prefecture, Japan
 Kada Station, a train station in Wakayama, Wakayama Prefecture

See also
 Qada (disambiguation)
 Joe Cada (born 1987), American poker player